Watkin Edward Jones (6 July 1917 – 23 August 1994) was a Welsh cricketer.  Jones was a right-handed batsman who bowled right-arm fast-medium.  He was born at Gwaun-cae-Gurwen, Glamorgan.

Jones made his first-class debut for Glamorgan against Lancashire in the 1946 County Championship. From 1947 to 1947, he played 4 further first-class matches for Glamorgan, playing his last first-class match against Sussex at Cardiff Arms Park. In his 5 first-class matches, he took 13 wickets at a bowling average of 26.30, with best figures of 7/92 against Kent.

Jones' day job as a police officer prevented him from playing more often. Jones died on 23 August 1994 at Morriston, Glamorgan.

References

External links
Wat Jones at Cricinfo
Wat Jones at CricketArchive

1917 births
1994 deaths
Cricketers from Neath Port Talbot
Welsh cricketers
Glamorgan cricketers
Welsh police officers
Glamorgan Police officers